Granulation is the process of forming grains or pellets from a powdery or solid (granular) material

Granulation can also refer to:

Granulation tissue, a product of healing in major wounds
Granulation (jewellery), small spheres of precious metal fused to a base piece

See also
 Granularity
 Granularity (parallel computing)
 Granular cheese
 Granular convection
 Granular material
 Granular synthesis of sound
 Granule (disambiguation)
 Granulometry (disambiguation)